The Galena station of Galena, Illinois was built in 1857 and originally served the Illinois Central Railroad. The two story Italianate structure is included in the Galena Historic District. Over the years, the station hosted the Illinois Central's Hawkeye, Iowan, Land O'Corn, and Sinnissippi trains. These trains connected Galena residents as far as Chicago in the east and as far west as Sioux City, Iowa. Passenger service ceased upon the formation of Amtrak in 1971, but resumed between Chicago and Dubuque in 1974 under the name Black Hawk. Service ceased again in September 30, 1981. Today, the old depot hosts the Galena Visitors Bureau.

Returning passenger rail service to this corridor has been proposed for a number of years, to provide residents a greater degree of freedom to travel.  Additionally, a long term extension could extend service from Chicago back to Sioux City.

Bibliography

References

External links
Galena, Illinois– TrainWeb

Former Amtrak stations in Illinois
Former Illinois Central Railroad stations
1854 establishments in Illinois
Railway stations closed in 1971
Railway stations in the United States opened in 1854
Railway stations closed in 1981
Railway stations on the National Register of Historic Places in Illinois